Shih Yi-fang (born 10 February 1962) is a Taiwanese engineer and politician.

Education and early career
He earned a bachelor's degree at National Taiwan University of Science and Technology, and obtained his master's of civil engineering from National Central University. Shih has served as spokesman for a collective of civil engineering professional associations and represented the Farglory Group.

Political career
Shih was placed on the Democratic Progressive Party's party list for the first time in 2008, and was defeated. He again represented the DPP as a proportional representation candidate in 2012, and lost for a second time. Shih ran for an at-large seat in 2016. Though he lost, Shih was selected to replace Lee Ying-yuan when Lee took office as minister of the Environmental Protection Administration. Shih was sworn in as a member of the Ninth Legislative Yuan on 26 May 2016.

References

1962 births
Living people
Politicians of the Republic of China on Taiwan from Changhua County
National Taiwan University of Science and Technology alumni
National Central University alumni
Taiwanese civil engineers